Pietro Marescalchi (1522–1589) or de Marascalchi was an Italian painter of the Renaissance, active near his hometown of Feltre in the Veneto. He is also referred to as Pietro de' Mariscalchi or Lo Spada. He is described as a more provincial reflection of the Mannerist style of Jacopo Bassano. He studied locally under Pietro Luzzi and perhaps under Morto da Feltre. He mainly painted for local churches.

References

1522 births
1589 deaths
16th-century Italian painters
Italian male painters
Italian Renaissance painters
Mannerist painters
People from Feltre